Eurythmidia is a monotypic snout moth genus described by George Hampson in 1901. Its only species, Eurythmidia ignidorsella, was first described by Émile Louis Ragonot in 1887. It is found in Arizona, Mexico and Panama.

References

Phycitinae
Monotypic moth genera
Moths of North America
Taxa named by George Hampson
Pyralidae genera